The East Asian cultural sphere, also known as the Sinosphere, the Sinic world, the Sinitic world, the Chinese cultural sphere, or the Chinese character sphere, encompasses multiple countries in East Asia and Southeast Asia that were historically influenced by Chinese culture. The East Asian cultural sphere is made up of several countries and territories: China, Taiwan, Hong Kong, Macau, Japan, South Korea, North Korea, and Vietnam. Other definitions sometimes include Mongolia and Singapore, because of limited historical Chinese influences or increasing modern-day Chinese diaspora. The East Asian cultural sphere is not to be confused with the Sinophone world, which includes countries where the Chinese-speaking population is dominant. 

There are many opinions that this definition does not include Vietnam because culture of Vietnam has a transitional nature between East Asian cultural sphere and Indian cultural sphere, the classification of Vietnam in Sinosphere or Indosphere is still controversial.

Imperial China was a regional power and exerted influence on tributary states and neighboring states, among which were Japan, Korea, and Vietnam. These interactions brought ideological and cultural influences rooted in Confucianism, Buddhism, and Taoism. During classical history, the four cultures shared a common imperial system under respective emperors. Chinese inventions influenced, and were in turn influenced by, innovations of the other cultures in governance, philosophy, science, and the arts. Written Classical Chinese became the regional lingua franca for literary, cultural, scientific and economic exchange, and Chinese characters (Hanzi) became locally adapted in Japan as Kanji, Korea as Hanja, and Vietnam as Chữ Hán.

In late classical history, the literary importance of classical Chinese diminished as Japan, Korea, and Vietnam each adopted their own literary device. Japan developed the Katakana and Hiragana scripts, Korea developed Hangul, and Vietnam developed Chữ Nôm (which is now rarely used; the modern Vietnamese alphabet is based on the Latin alphabet). Classical literature written in Chinese characters nonetheless remains an important legacy of Japanese, Korean, and Vietnamese cultures. In the 21st century, ideological and cultural influences of Confucianism and Buddhism remain visible in high culture and social doctrines.

Terminology 
Ancient China has been regarded as one of the centers of civilization, with the emergent cultures that arose from the migration of original Han settlers from the Yellow River generally regarded as the starting point of the East Asian world. Today its population is approximately 1.402 billion.

Japanese historian  (1919–1998), professor emeritus at the University of Tokyo, originally coined the term , conceiving of a Chinese or East-Asian cultural sphere distinct from the cultures of the west. According to Nishijima, this cultural sphere—which includes China, Japan, Korea, and Vietnam—shared the philosophy of Confucianism, the religion of Buddhism, and similar political and social structures stemming from a background of historical scholars in Classical Chinese.

Etymology 
(cf. Sinophone.)

As cognates of each other, the "CJKV" languages—Chinese, Japanese, Korean, and Vietnamese—translate the English term sphere as:

 Chinese:  ('circle, ring, corral, pen')
 Japanese:  ('sphere, circle, range, radius')
 Korean:  ( from 圏)
 Vietnamese:  /  from 圏 

Victor H. Mair discussed the origins of these "culture sphere" terms. The Chinese  dates back to a 1941 translation for the German term , ('culture circle, field'), which the Austrian ethnologists Fritz Graebner and Wilhelm Schmidt proposed. Nishijima devised these Sinitic "cultural spheres" within his .

Chinese–English dictionaries provide similar translations of this keyword  as "the intellectual or literary circles" (Liang Shiqiu 1975) and "literary, educational circles" (Lin Yutang 1972).

The Sinosphere may be taken to be synonymous to Ancient China and its descendant civilizations as well as the "Far Eastern civilizations" (the Mainland and the Japanese ones). In the 1930s in A Study of History, the Sinosphere along with the Western, Islamic, Eastern Orthodox, Indic, etc. civilizations is presented as among the major "units of study."

Comparisons with the West 
British historian Arnold J. Toynbee listed the Far Eastern civilization as one of the main civilizations outlined in his book, A Study of History. He included Japan and Korea in his definition of "Far Eastern civilization" and proposed that they grew out of the "Sinic civilization" that originated in the Yellow River basin. Toynbee compared the relationship between the Sinic and Far Eastern civilization with that of the Hellenic and Western civilizations, which had an "apparentation-affiliation."

American Sinologist and historian Edwin O. Reischauer also grouped China, Japan, Korea, and Vietnam into a cultural sphere that he called the Sinic world, a group of centralized states that share a Confucian ethical philosophy. Reischauer states that this culture originated in Northern China, comparing the relationship between Northern China and East Asia to that of Greco-Roman civilization and Europe. The elites of East Asia were tied together through a common written language based on Chinese characters, much in the way that Latin had functioned in Europe.

American political scientist Samuel P. Huntington considered the Sinic world as one of many civilizations in his book The Clash of Civilizations. He notes that "all scholars recognize the existence of either a single distinct Chinese civilization dating back to at least 1500 B.C. and perhaps a thousand years earlier, or of two Chinese civilizations one succeeding the other in the early centuries of the Christian epoch." Huntington's Sinic civilization includes China, North Korea, South Korea, Vietnam and Chinese communities in Southeast Asia. Of the many civilizations that Huntington discusses, the Sinic world is the only one that is based on a cultural, rather than religious, identity. Huntington's theory was that in a post-Cold War world, humanity "[identifies] with cultural groups: tribes, ethnic groups, religious communities [and] at the broadest level, civilizations." Yet, Huntington considered Japan as a distinct civilization.

Culture

Arts 

 Architecture: Countries from the East Asian cultural sphere (Japan, Korea, Vietnam, Taiwan) share a common architectural style stemming from the architecture of ancient China.
 Calligraphy: Caoshu is a cursive script-style used in Chinese and East Asian calligraphy.
 Cinema: see, Hong Kong cinema, Taiwanese cinema, Chinese cinema, Japanese cinema, Korean cinema, Vietnamese cinema.
 Comic: see, Manga (Japanese comics), Manhua (Chinese comics), Manhwa (Korean comics), Truyện tranh (Vietnamese comics).
 Martial Arts: see, Gōngfu (Kung fu; Chinese Martial Arts); Taekwondo and Hapkido (Korean Martial Arts); Karate, Aikido, Jūdō and Sumo (Japanese Martial Arts); Vovinam and  Nhất Nam (Vietnamese Martial Arts).
 Music: Chinese musical instruments, such as erhu, have influenced those of Korea, Japan, Taiwan, and Vietnam.
 Clothing: Hanfu, Hanbok, Việt phục, Wafuku, all use silk and have similar mandarin, soldiers, officials, and emperors/empress traditional clothing. Jade jewelry and ornaments were also highly valued throughout East Asia, South Asia, Southeast Asia, etc.

Cuisine 

The cuisine of East Asia shares many of the same ingredients and techniques. Chopsticks are used as an eating utensil in all of the core East Asian countries. The use of soy sauce, which is made from fermenting soybeans, is also widespread in the region.

Rice is the staple food in all of East Asia and is a major focus of food security. People who have no rice are often seen as having no food. Moreover, in East Asian countries such as Japan (御飯; gohan) and Korea (밥; bap), the word for 'cooked rice' can embody the meaning of food in general.

Popular terms associated with East Asian cuisine include boba, kimchi, sushi, hot pot, tea, dim sum, ramen, as well as phở, sashimi, udon, bánh mì among others.

Traditions 

 Fashion: see, Hanfu and Cheongsam (or Qipao) (China); Áo dài and Việt phục (Vietnam); Hanbok (Korea); Kimono and Wafuku (Japan).
 Dance: The Lion Dance is a form of traditional dance in Chinese culture and other culturally East Asian countries in which performers mimic a lion's movements in a lion costume to bring good luck and fortune. Aside from China, versions of the lion dance are found in Japan, Korea, Vietnam, Tibet, and Taiwan. Lion Dances are usually performed during Lunar New Year, religious and cultural celebrations.
 New Year: China (Zhōngguó Xīn Nián), Korea (Seollal), Vietnam (Tết Nguyên Đán), Japan (Koshōgatsu), and Taiwan traditionally observe the same Lunar New Year. However, Japan has moved its New Year (Shōgatsu) to fit the Western New Year since the Meiji Restoration. Although mainland Japan may not celebrate the Lunar New Year anymore, there are some indigenous minority ethnic groups in Japan that still do such as the Okinawan/Ryukyuan people. Okinawa has traditionally observed the Lunar New Year because of heavy Chinese influence in its past. Festivities nowadays aren't as elaborate as the Western new year but, Okinawans still celebrate and partake in many traditions for Lunar New Year.

Literature 

East-Asian literary culture is based on the use of Literary Chinese, which became the medium of scholarship and government across the region. Although each of these countries developed vernacular writing systems and used them for popular literature, they continued to use Chinese for all formal writing until it was swept away by rising nationalism around the end of the 19th century.

Throughout East Asia, Literary Chinese was the language of administration and scholarship. Although Vietnam, Korea, and Japan each developed writing systems for their languages, these were limited to popular literature. Chinese remained the medium of formal writing until it was displaced by vernacular writing in the late 19th and early 20th centuries. Though they did not use Chinese for spoken communication, each country had its tradition of reading texts aloud, the so-called Sino-Xenic pronunciations, which provide clues to the pronunciation of Middle Chinese. Chinese words with these pronunciations were also borrowed extensively into the local vernaculars, and today comprise over half their vocabularies.

Books in Literary Chinese were widely distributed. By the 7th century and possibly earlier, woodblock printing had been developed in China. At first, it was used only to copy the Buddhist scriptures, but later secular works were also printed. By the 13th century, metal movable type was used by government printers in Korea but seems to have not been extensively used in China, Vietnam, or Japan. At the same time manuscript reproduction remained important until the late 19th century.

Japan's textual scholarship had Chinese origin which made Japan one of the birthplaces of modern Sinology.

Philosophy and religion 

The Art of War, Tao Te Ching, I Ching and Analects are classic Chinese texts that have been influential in East Asian history.

Taoism 

The countries of Taiwan, China, Korea, Vietnam and Japan have been influenced by Taoism. Developed from Eastern philosophy, known as Tao, the religion was created in China from the teachings of Lao Tse. It follows the search for the tao, a concept that is equivalent to a path or course and represents the cosmic force that creates the universe and all things.

According to this belief, the wisdom of the Tao is the only source of the universe and must be a natural path of life events that everyone should follow. Thus, the adherents of Taoism follow the search for Tao, which means path and represents the strength of the universe.

The most important text in Taoism, the Tao Te Ching (Book of the Way and Virtue, c. 300 BC), declares that the Tao is the "source" of the universe, thus considered a creative principle, but not as a deity. Nature manifests itself spontaneously, without a higher intention, it is up to the human being to integrate, through "non-action" ("wuwei") and spontaneity ("ziran"), to its flow and rhythms, to achieve happiness and a long life.

Taoism is a combination of teachings from various sources, manifesting itself as a system that can be philosophical, religious or ethical. This tradition can also be presented as a worldview and a way of life.

Buddhism 

The countries of China, Japan, Korea, and Vietnam share a history of Mahayana Buddhism. It spread from India via the Silk Road through north-west India and modern day Pakistan, Xinjiang, eastward through Southeast Asia, Vietnam, then north through Guangzhou and Fujian. From China, it proliferated to Korea and Japan, especially during the Six Dynasties. It could have also re-spread from China south to Vietnam. East Asia is now home to the largest Buddhist population in the world at around 200–400 million, with the top five countries including China, Thailand, Myanmar, Japan, Vietnam—three of which falling within the East-Asian Cultural Sphere.

Buddhist philosophy is guided by the teachings of the Buddha, which lead the individual to full happiness through meditative practices, mindfulness, and reflection on their daily actions. The belief is that physical and spiritual awareness leads to a state of enlightenment called nirvana, which according to Buddha is the highest state of meditation. In this state the individual finds peace and tranquility above the oscillations of thoughts and emotions, and is rid of the inherent suffering of the physical world.

Confucianism 

The countries of China, Japan, Korea, and Vietnam share a Confucian philosophical worldview. Confucianism is a humanistic philosophy that believes that human beings are teachable, improvable and perfectible through personal and communal endeavor especially including self-cultivation and self-creation. Confucianism focuses on the cultivation of virtue and maintenance of ethics, the most basic of which are:

 rén: an obligation of altruism and humaneness for other individuals; 
 yì (/): the upholding of righteousness and the moral disposition to do good; and 
 lǐ (/): a system of norms and propriety that determines how a person should properly act in everyday life.

Neo-Confucianism 

Mid-Imperial Chinese philosophy is primarily defined by the development of Neo-Confucianism. During the Tang dynasty, Buddhism from Nepal also became a prominent philosophical and religious discipline. Neo-Confucianism has its origins in the Tang dynasty; the Confucianist scholar Han Yu is seen as a forebear of the Neo-Confucianists of the Song dynasty. The Song dynasty philosopher Zhou Dunyi is seen as the first true "pioneer" of Neo-Confucianism, using Daoist metaphysics as a framework for his ethical philosophy.

Elsewhere in East Asia, Japanese philosophy began to develop as indigenous Shinto beliefs fused with Buddhism, Confucianism and other schools of Chinese philosophy. Similar to Japan, in Korean philosophy elements of Shamanism were integrated into the Neo-Confucianism imported from China. In Vietnam, neo-Confucianism along with Taoism and Buddhism were also developed into Vietnam's own Tam giáo, which together with Vietnamese folk religion contributed to perfecting Vietnamese philosophy.

Other religions 
Though not commonly identified with that of East Asia, the following religions have been influential in its history:
 Hinduism, see Hinduism in Vietnam, Hinduism in China
 Islam is the most popular religion in Xinjiang, and has significant communities in Ningxia. See Islam in China, Islam in Hong Kong, Islam in Japan, Islam in Korea, Islam in Vietnam.
 Christianity is the most popular religion in South Korea and ranks among the most popular in Singapore. Significant Christian communities are also found in China, Hong Kong, Japan, Macau, Taiwan and Vietnam.

Language

Historical linguistics 
Various languages are thought to have originated in East Asia and have various degrees of influence on each other. These include:
Sino-Tibetan: Spoken mainly in China, Singapore, Myanmar, Christmas Island, Bhutan, Northeast India, Kashmir and parts of Nepal. Major Sino-Tibetan languages include the varieties of Chinese, the Tibetic languages, and Burmese. These are thought to have originated around the Yellow River north of the Yangzi.
Austronesian: Spoken mainly in what is today Taiwan, East Timor, Brunei, Indonesia, the Philippines, Singapore, Malaysia, the Cocos (Keeling) Islands, Christmas Island, Madagascar and most of Oceania. Major Austronesian languages include the Formosan languages, Malay, Filipino, Malagasy, and Māori.
Turkic: Spoken mainly in China, Russia, Turkmenistan, Kyrgyzstan, Uzbekistan, Kazakhstan, Azerbaijan, Iran, Cyprus, and Turkey. Major Turkic languages include Kazakh, Kyrgyz, Uyghur, Tuvan, and Altai.
Austroasiatic: Spoken mainly in Vietnam and Cambodia. Major Austroasiatic languages include Vietnamese and Khmer.
Kra-Dai: Spoken mainly in Thailand, Laos, and parts of Southern China. Major Kra-Dai languages include Zhuang, Thai, and Lao.
Mongolic: Spoken mainly in Mongolia, China and Russia. Major Mongolian languages include Oirat, Mongolian, Monguor, Dongxiang, and Buryat.
Tungusic: Spoken mainly in China and Russia. Major Tungusic languages include Evenki, Manchu, and Xibe.
Koreanic: Spoken mainly in Korea. Major Korean languages include Korean and Jeju.
Japonic: Spoken mainly in Japan. Major Japonic languages include Japanese, Ryukyuan, and Hachijo.
Ainu: Spoken mainly in Japan. The only surviving Ainu language is Hokkaido Ainu.

Core languages of the East Asian Cultural Sphere are predominantly Chinese, Japanese, Korean, and Vietnamese, and their respective variants. These are well-documented to have historically used Chinese characters, with Japanese, Korean, and Vietnamese each having roughly 60% of their vocabulary derived from Chinese. There is a small set of minor languages that are comparable to the core East Asian languages such as Zhuang and Hmong-Mien. They are often overlooked since neither have their own country or heavily export their culture, but Zhuang has been written in Hanzi inspired characters called Sawndip for over 1000 years. Hmong, while having supposedly lacked a writing system until modern history, is also suggested to have a similar percentage of Chinese loans to the core CJKV languages as well.

Despite other languages having been influenced by the Sinosphere such as Thai with its Thai numeral system and Mongolian with its historical use of Hanzi, the amount of Chinese vocabulary overall is not nearly as expansive in these languages as the core CJKV, or even Zhuang and Hmong.

Various hypotheses seek to unify various subsets of the above languages, including the Sino-Austronesian, Altaic, and Austric language groupings. An overview of these various language groups is discussed in Jared Diamond's Germs, Guns, and Steel, and various other places.

Writing systems 
East Asia is quite diverse in writing systems, from the Brahmic, inspired abugidas of SEA, the logographic hanzi of China, the syllabaries of Japan, and various alphabets and abjads used in Korea (Hangul), Vietnam (Latin), etc.

Character influences 

Hanzi ( or ) is considered the common culture that unifies the languages and cultures of many East Asian nations. Historically, Japan, Korea, and Vietnam have used Chinese characters. Today, they are mainly used in China, Japan, and South Korea albeit in different forms.

Mainland China, Malaysia and Singapore uses simplified characters, whereas Taiwan, Hong Kong, and Macau use Traditional Chinese.

Japan still uses kanji but has also invented kana, inspired by the Chinese cursive script.

Korea used to write in hanja but has invented an alphabetic system called hangul (also inspired by Chinese and phags-pa during the Mongol Empire) that is nowadays the majority script. However, hanja is a required subject in South Korea. Most names are also written in hanja. Hanja is also studied and used in academia, newspapers, and law; areas where a lot of scholarly terms and Sino-Korean loanwords are used and necessary to distinguish between otherwise ambiguous homonyms.

Vietnam used to write in chữ Hán or Classical Chinese. Since the 8th century they began inventing many of their own chữ Nôm. Since French colonization, they have switched to using a modified version of the Latin alphabet called chữ Quốc ngữ. However, Chinese characters still hold a special place in the cultures as their history and literature have been greatly influenced by Chinese characters. In Vietnam (and North Korea), chữ Hán can be seen in temples, cemeteries, and monuments today, as well as serving as decorative motifs in art and design. And there are movements to restore Hán Nôm in Vietnam. (Also see History of writing in Vietnam.)

Zhuang people are similar to the Vietnamese in that they used to write in Sawgun (Chinese characters) and have invented many of their characters called Sawndip (Immature characters or native characters). Sawndip is still used informally and in traditional settings, but in 1957, the People's Republic of China introduced an alphabetical script for the language, which is what it officially promotes.

Economy and trade 
Before European imperialism, East Asia has always been one of the largest economies in the world, whose output had mostly been driven by China and the Silk Road. During the Industrial Revolution, East Asia modernized and became an area of economic power starting with the Meiji Restoration in the late 19th century when Japan rapidly transformed itself into the only industrial power outside the North Atlantic area. Japan's early industrial economy reached its height in World War II (1939-1945) when it expanded its empire and became a major world power.

The business cultures within the Sinosphere in some ways are heavily influenced by Chinese culture. Important in China is the social concept of guanxi, which has influenced the societies of Korea, Vietnam and Japan as well. Japan often features hierarchically organized companies, and Japanese work environments place a high value on interpersonal relationships. Korean businesses, adhering to Confucian values, are structured around a patriarchal family governed by filial piety between management and a company's employees.

Post-WW2 (Tiger economies) 
Following Japanese defeat, economic collapse after the war, and US military occupation, Japan's economy recovered in the 1950s with the post-war economic miracle in which rapid growth propelled the country to become the world's second-largest economy by the 1980s.

After the Korean War, US military occupation following the surrender of Japan in World War 2, and ultimate division of the Korean peninsula,  South Korea has experienced its postwar economic miracle called the Miracle on the Han River, with the rise of global tech industry leaders like Samsung, LG, etc. As of 2019 its economy is the 4th largest in Asia and the 11th largest in the world.

Hong Kong became one of the Four Asian Tiger economies, developing strong textile and manufacturing economies. South Korea followed a similar route, developing the textile industry. Following in the footsteps of Hong Kong and Korea, Taiwan and Singapore quickly industrialized through government policies. By 1997, all four of the Asian Tiger economies had joined Japan as economically developed nations.

Since the 1990s Japanese growth has stagnated (see also Lost Decade), and present growth in East Asia has now shifted to China and to the Tiger Cub Economies of Southeast Asia, particularly Vietnam.

Modern era 
Since the Chinese economic reform, China has become the 2nd and 1st-largest economy in the world respectively by nominal GDP and GDP (PPP). The Pearl River Delta is one of the top startup regions (comparable with Beijing and Shanghai) in East Asia.

Up until the early 2010s, Vietnamese trade was heavily dependent on China, and many Chinese-Vietnamese speak both Cantonese and Vietnamese, which share many linguistic similarities. Vietnam, one of Next Eleven countries , is regarded as a rising economic power in Southeast Asia.

East Asia participates in numerous global economic organizations including:

 Belt and Road Initiative
 Shanghai Cooperation Organization
 ASEAN, ASEAN Plus Three, AFTA
 East Asia Summit
 East Asian Community
 Regional Comprehensive Economic Partnership

See also 

 Sinosphere (linguistics)
 China–Vietnam relations
 Adoption of Chinese literary culture
 East Asia
 Sinophone world
 Sino-xenic vocabulary
 Culture of China
 Chinese influence on Korean culture
 Chinese influence on Japanese culture
 Culture of Japan
 Culture of Korea
 Culture of Hong Kong
 Culture of Macau
 Culture of Taiwan
 Ryukyuan culture
 Culture of Vietnam
 Baiyue
 I Ching's influence
 List of tributary states of China
 List of Confucian states and dynasties
 Little China (ideology)
 Pax Sinica
 Four Asian Tigers
 Greater East Asia Co-Prosperity Sphere
 Greater India
 Indosphere
 Greater Iran
Persianate Society
 Sinicization
 Cultural area

Notes

References

Citations

Sources 

 

 
 Joshua Fogel, "The Sinic World," in Ainslie Thomas Embree, Carol Gluck, ed., Asia in Western and World History a Guide for Teaching. (Armonk, N.Y.: M.E. Sharpe, Columbia Project on Asia in the Core Curriculum, 1997). .  Access may be limited to NetLibrary affiliated libraries. EBSCOhost Login

External links 
 Asia for Educators. Weatherhead East Asian Institute, Columbia University.

Chinese culture
Chinese nationalism
Asian civilizations
Country classifications
Cultural regions
East Asia
Southeast Asia
East Asian culture
Foreign relations of China
Japanese culture
Korean culture
Vietnamese culture
Spheres of influence